The Battle of Arlabán, a battle of the First Carlist War, occurred at the heights of Arlabán, between the provinces of Álava and Guipúzcoa.  Between 16 and 17 January 1836, the Liberals occupied Arlaban after dislodging the Carlist forces there.  The Liberals were commanded by Luis Fernández de Córdova and were supported by the British Legion, French Legion, and units commanded by Baldomero Espartero; the forces were divided along three fronts.  After conquering Arlabán as well as Legutiano (Villarreal de Álava), however, the Liberals were pushed back by the Carlists on 18 January, suffering a large number of casualties.

External links
 Historia militar del siglo XIX en el País Vasco, Diputación Foral de Guipúzcoa.

1836 in Spain
Conflicts in 1836

Battles of the First Carlist War involving the British Auxiliary Legion
Battles involving the French Foreign Legion
Battles in the Basque Country (autonomous community)
Basque history